EUTM may refer to:

 European Union trade mark
 European Union Training Mission, including:
 EUTM CAR (Central African Republic)
 EUTM Mali
 European Union Training Mission Somalia